This is a list of post-dubstep musicians.

List

Chase & Status
Darkstar
Flux Pavilion
Gemini
Gold Panda
Ikonika
Jakwob
James Blake
Jamie Woon
Jamie xx
Joker
Joy Orbison
Kode9
Magnetic Man
Mount Kimbie
Nero
Scuba
SBTRKT
Sepalcure
Stubborn Heart
XXYYXX
Zomby

References

Post-dubstep
Post-dubstep